Pachydactylus punctatus, also known as the pointed thick-toed gecko or speckled thick-toed gecko, is a species of lizard in the family Gekkonidae. It is found in southern Africa (South Africa, Namibia, Botswana, Zimbabwe, Mozambique, Angola, Zambia, and southern Democratic Republic of the Congo).

References

Pachydactylus
Geckos of Africa
Reptiles of Angola
Reptiles of Botswana
Reptiles of the Democratic Republic of the Congo
Reptiles of Mozambique
Reptiles of Namibia
Reptiles of South Africa
Reptiles of Zambia
Reptiles of Zimbabwe
Taxa named by Wilhelm Peters
Reptiles described in 1854